The Prevention of Social Housing Fraud Act 2013 (c. 3) is an Act of the Parliament of the United Kingdom which will create offences and make other provision relating to sub-letting and parting with possession of social housing and for connected purposes.

References

United Kingdom Acts of Parliament 2013
Fraud legislation
Housing in the United Kingdom
Fraud in the United Kingdom